Bayshore Gardens is a neighborhood within the city limits of Tampa, Florida. As of the 2010 census the neighborhood had a population of 1,760. The ZIP Codes serving the area are 33606 and 33629.

Geography
Bayshore Gardens boundaries are Howard Avenue to the northeast, Lee Roy Selmon Expressway to the west, Bay to Bay Boulevard to the south, and Bayshore Boulevard to the southeast.

Demographics
Source: Hillsborough County Atlas

At the 2010 census there were 1,760 people and 1,227 households residing in the neighborhood. The population density was 9,153/mi2. The racial makeup of the neighborhood was 93.0% White, 2.0% African American,0.0% Native American, 2.0% Asian, 1.0% from other races, and 2.0% from two or more races. Hispanic or Latino of any race were about 10.0%.

Of the 1,227 households 3% had children under the age of 18 living with them, 21% were married couples living together, 3% had a female householder with no husband present, and 6% non-families. 66% of households were made up of individuals.

The age distribution was 6% under the age of 18, 29% from 18 to 34, 17% from 35 to 49, 19% from 50 to 64, and 31% 65 or older. For every 100 females, there were 80.0 males.

The per capita income for the neighborhood was $46,457. About 8% of the population were below the poverty line. Of those, none are the under age 18.

See also
Neighborhoods in Tampa, Florida

References

External links
Bayshore Gardens Neighborhood Association

Neighborhoods in Tampa, Florida
Populated places on Tampa Bay